Richard "Rich" Vernon is a British musician and songwriter best known as the bass guitarist of UK rock band The Mission, and previously with The Only Ones vocalist and cult artist Peter Perrett in The One. He has recorded two studio and four live albums with The Mission including the critically acclaimed God is a Bullet, as well as two with The One and one with Helter Skelter. He also appeared as a guest musician on The Dead Guitars album Flags, in 2008.

Early life
Richard Vernon was born in Chichester, England, and relocated with his family to London until the age of two, when his family returned to their native Wales. His first musical instrument was a six-string guitar, followed by a brief dalliance with the drums, and finally bass guitar.

Early career
At the age of 20, Vernon left his home in Wales and moved to London, starting his musical career as a session player in a number of bands including Eddie and the Hot Rods. Over his career, he has played with musicians from The Kinks, Squeeze, The Adventures, The Charlatans, The Waterboys, The Monochrome Set, The Pink Fairies, The Wonder Stuff, The Pretenders, The Damned and many others. A change of pace saw him playing for UK agitpop band A Popular History of Signs on various European tours. Soon thereafter he co-founded Rough Trade and Island Records act Helter Skelter. They recorded a critically acclaimed album and garnered a single of the week award from Melody Maker. They toured Europe to support the album and recorded two BBC Radio 1 sessions, but a combination of limited success and struggles after PolyGram took over of Island Records saw them split shortly after.

The One
Vernon then joined Peter Perrett's group The One. The band made two studio albums and one live album as well as extensively touring around the UK, France, Spain, Germany, Holland, Belgium and Japan. Their critically acclaimed Woke Up Sticky album received enthusiastic reviews from The Guardian and Daily Telegraph. With equally good reviews for their live shows, the band promised much but after a busy and productive five-year period they drifted apart. Perrett's biographer, Nina Antonia in her book Homme Fatale, puts this down to Perrett's increasingly erratic behaviour, whilst other band members have been quoted that the band had just run its course.

The Mission
Following a call from Perrett's tour manager, Vernon was asked to join The Mission as replacement for departing founder member Craig Adams. During his tenure with the band, Vernon recorded two studio albums (God is a Bullet and Dumb Dumb Bullet). God is a Bullet charted in the UK Top 30 Independent Label Album Chart and UK Top 40 Rock Album Chart. The first single, "Keep it in the Family", charted at number 7 in the BBC 1 Rock Chart. The band also recorded a live album from London's Shepherd's Bush Empire over four consecutive sold out nights, which was billed as the last Mission shows for the foreseeable future. Vernon also recorded two live DVDs with the band as well as touring all over the UK, Europe, America, Canada and South Africa. He also contributed towards the Mission biography, At War with the Gods, published in 2015.

Post-Mission
After leaving The Mission, Vernon decided to spend more time co-writing music and record production, and to focus on his family. He still found time to play live shows, including some with UK band The Sentimentalists, including an appearance at the Glastonbury Festival in 2015.

In November 2016, Vernon replaced Robbie Crane in Ricky Warwick's band The Fighting Hearts for a UK tour, supported by Vice Squad.

Vernon joined MGT on tour for a March 2018 US tour to promote their album "Gemini Nyte". The band included ex-Mission UK mate, Mark Gemini Thwaite, along with Ashton Nyte and Jared Shavelson; their performances met an extremely positive response.

In March 2022, Vernon continued his role with Ricky Warwick & The Fighting Hearts for a month-long tour of the UK and Ireland, alongside Warwick, guitarist Ben Christo (The Sisters of Mercy) and drummer Jack Taylor (Tax the Heat). Further shows followed in May, with Christo replaced by Sam Wood (Wayward Sons), and in August, two shows in Dublin and Belfast supporting Stiff Little Fingers.

Equipment
Vernon plays bass guitar, guitar and occasionally, drums. Key to his signature bass sound is the use of vintage Fender basses and Trace Elliot backline.

Personal life
He lives in a converted chapel in North Wales with his Japanese wife, their two children, and his father. More recently, he has been heavily involved with politics, aiming to keep the U.K. in the European Union via his campaigning work with Wales for Europe.

Recorded works

The following represent the body of recorded works that Vernon has been involved with:

References

External links
 The Mission UK official site
 At War With the Gods – Unofficial Mission biography
 The Sentimentalists official site
 "God is a Bullet" Review – TerrorVerlag

Living people
People from Chichester
English rock guitarists
English songwriters
Gothic rock musicians
Alternative rock guitarists
1966 births